Stenygrocercus is a genus of South Pacific spiders in the family Euagridae. It was first described by Eugène Simon in 1892.

Species
 it contains the following species, all found in New Caledonia:
Stenygrocercus alphoreus Raven, 1991 – New Caledonia
Stenygrocercus franzi Raven, 1991 – New Caledonia
Stenygrocercus kresta Raven, 1991 – New Caledonia
Stenygrocercus recineus Raven, 1991 – New Caledonia
Stenygrocercus silvicola (Simon, 1889) (type) – New Caledonia
Stenygrocercus simoni Raven, 1991 – New Caledonia

References

Euagridae
Mygalomorphae genera
Taxa named by Eugène Simon